The 1932 WANFL season was the 48th season of the Western Australian National Football League. West Perth's win was highlighted by the success of champion full forward Ted Tyson, who headed the goalkicking with eighty-four goals including a record eight in the Grand Final. Tyson went on to kick an unprecedented 1,203 goals during a twelve-season career with the Cardinals, but their rise from winning only six matches in 1931 was due to the development of second-year defender Max Tetley, the discovery of a third pre-war Cardinal stalwart in Norm McDiarmid, brother of star ruckman Jack, plus further outstanding youngsters Jim Morgan and Bob Dalziell.

It also saw a continuation of the first player drain from the WANFL to the VFL with the loss of Subiaco's Brighton Diggins and Bill Faul resulting in the Lions missing the finals for the first time in nine seasons, a remarkable record for scoring accuracy by Old Easts in slippery conditions, and a longtime record total of suspensions – the last of which was for twelve weeks and ended his career – to "Nails" Western, who had been recruited by Claremont-Cottesloe from East Perth to add toughness and vigour but played little because of his reports. Despite the return of Keith Hough, who set a record for the Sandover Medal with 32 votes, Claremont-Cottesloe remained on the bottom with only one extra victory. Two tragic deaths occurred – Claremont's vice captain "Boy" Morris after collapsing in the street five weeks beforehand on the Saturday of Round 18, and more significantly South Fremantle's Ron Doig after the first semi-final.

Home-and-away season

Round 1

Round 2 (Labour Day)

Round 3

Round 4

Round 5

Round 6

Round 7 (Foundation Day)

Round 8

Round 9

Round 10

Round 11

Round 12

Round 13

Round 14

Round 15

Round 16

Round 17

Round 18

Round 19

Round 20

Round 21

Ladder

Finals

First semi-final

Second semi-final

Preliminary final

Grand final

Notes
Tyson's feat was bettered by Eric Gorman in the 1963 Grand Final with nine goals.Along with W. Clelland between 1897 and 1905, and Mel Whinnen between 1960 and 1975, the trio hold the West Perth record for most premierships as a player, having played in 1932, 1934, 1935 and 1941.Claremont have never been goalless at three-quarter time; against Swan Districts in June of 1975 they also kicked their first goal in time-on of the third quarter.

References

External links
Official WAFL website
WANFL Season 1932

West Australian Football League seasons
WANFL season